Cəngi (also, Dzhangi) is a village in the Gobustan Rayon of Azerbaijan.  The village forms part of the municipality of Nabur.

References 

Populated places in Gobustan District